"If You Asked Me To" is a song written by American songwriter Diane Warren. It was originally recorded by American singer Patti LaBelle for her ninth studio album, Be Yourself (1989), and also for the soundtrack to the James Bond film Licence to Kill. The lyrics are from the point of view of a woman who pleads to her significant other: "If you asked me to, I just might change my mind, and let you in my life forever". Three years later, Canadian singer Celine Dion covered the song for her 1992 self-titled second English-language studio album. Released as the album's second single, Dion's version topped the Canadian charts and peaked at number four on the US Billboard Hot 100.

Background 
"If You Asked Me To" was first featured on the soundtrack of the 1989 James Bond movie, Licence to Kill. The song's title refers to dialogue from the film. LaBelle's version peaked at number 79 on the US Billboard Hot 100, at number 10 on the Hot R&B/Hip-Hop Songs, and at number 11 on the Hot Adult Contemporary Tracks. The song appeared on the daytime soap opera General Hospital in 1989.

Critical reception 
Pan-European magazine Music & Media described the song as "a smooth, mid-tempo ballad with a synthesizer-dominated AC production by Stewart Levine".

Music video 

The music video for "If You Asked Me To" was filmed the day after the funeral of LaBelle's sister Jacqueline "Jackie" Padgett who died of lung cancer at age 43. (She was the third of LaBelle's sisters to die; all three of Patti's sisters died before age 44.) As such, the context of the song changed dramatically, as a mourning LaBelle, dressed in black, sings the song in a church (with candles and mourning lilies), intercut with shots of her in tears.

Personnel 
Arranged by Aaron Zigman
Produced by Stewart Levine
Recorded and mixed by Darren Klein
Bunny Hull, Paulette Brown, Valerie Pinkston-Mayo: backing vocals
Michael Landau: guitars
Aaron Zigman: keyboards, synthesizers
Lenny Castro: percussion

Chart performance 
Despite being a Top 10 hit on the US Billboard Hot R&B/Hip-Hop Songs charts, the song did not crossover to the pop charts until Celine Dion covered it three years later. Regarding the subject, LaBelle once explained during an interview used for the liner notes of her 1999 Greatest Hits album what she believed to be the reason for this fact: "I knew the song was a hit when I recorded it, and I was happy that Celine did it and did so well with it. But the arrangements are so close and we both have pretty powerful voices...so who knows why my version didn't take off. Maybe it was timing..".

Charts

Celine Dion version 

Celine Dion's cover version of "If You Asked Me To" was released as the second single from her 1992 self-titled studio album. It was produced by Guy Roche and released in Canada and the United States in April 1992 and later the same year in the rest of the world. The single includes a non-album B-side, "Love You Blind", written by Sheryl Crow and Jay Oliver, and produced by Walter Afanasieff. Later, "If You Asked Me To" was included on the North American versions of Dion's greatest hits albums, All the Way… A Decade of Song (1999) and My Love: Essential Collection (2008).

Critical reception 
AllMusic senior editor Stephen Thomas Erlewine named "If You Asked Me To" a standout song of the album, along with "Beauty and the Beast" and "Love Can Move Mountains". An editor from Billboard called it a "lush" and "dramatic" ballad. Another editor, Larry Flick, wrote that Dion reinterprets Patti LaBelle's hit "with highly positive results". He stated that "she proves she is on the road to developing a fine and distinctive vocal style". Clark and DeVaney from Cashbox noted, "Now that the world knows who this Canadian songstress is", viewing the song as "powerful and emotional". Dayton Daily News said it is "hauntingly beautiful". Dave Sholin from the Gavin Report felt that Dion "deserves all the accolades she's gotten the past few years, and surely her rendition of this touching Diane Warren ballad [...] takes her to a new level". Another editors, Rufer and Fell, stated that the singer "makes it fresh and uniquely her own". Geoff Edgers from Salon Magazine wrote that "If You Asked Me To", "with Dion's moaning, pleading, screaming take-me vocals, works when reassessed as a chunk of modern soul as worthy as anything recorded by Whitney Houston or Mariah Carey". Jonathan Bernstein from Spin declared the song as "sensational", adding that it "proves that astringency, urgency, and dressing down may win out over homogeneity, artifice, and insincerity, but a good Diane Warren hook lives forever."

Commercial performance 
The single was a hit in the United States and Canada. "If You Asked Me To" reached number four on the US Billboard Hot 100, and did even better on the Billboard Adult Contemporary chart, spending three weeks at number one. Also in Canada, it reached number one. The single had moderate success elsewhere. "If You Asked Me To" was released twice in the United Kingdom: first, in June 1992, when it peaked at number 60, and the second time in December 1992, when it reached number 57.

Music video 
The accompanying music video for the song was directed by Dominic Orlando and filmed in Chatsworth and Hollywood, Los Angeles. It was released in April 1992 and included later on Dion's 2001 DVD video collection All the Way… A Decade of Song & Video.

In the video, Dion performs the song in a manor. In the beginning she is sitting alone in a room, by a large window. A scene shows a hand stroking her cheek. In other scenes she is dressed in a white dress and surrounded by mirrors. Some outdoor scenes also shows Dion, as she walks outside the house. When the video ends, a man holds her around where she sits in her room.

Accolades 
In 1993, "If You Asked Me To" won an ASCAP Pop Award for most performed song in the United States. It was also nominated for the Billboard Music Award for Hot Adult Contemporary Single of the Year and Juno Award for Single of the Year (the latter was won by Dion's "Beauty and the Beast"). About.com placed the song at number one in their ranking of "Top 10 Celine Dion Songs" in 2017, describing it as a "big midtempo ballad".

Personnel 
 Celine Dion – vocals
 Jean McClain, Larry Jacobs, Terry Wood – background vocals
 Michael Thompson – guitar
 Guy Roche – synth
 John Robinson – drums

Track listings 

 Australian cassette and CD, Canadian and US cassette, Japanese 3-inch, European and UK 7-inch and cassette single
 "If You Asked Me To" – 3:55
 "Love You Blind" – 4:35

 European CD single
 "If You Asked Me To" – 3:55
 "Love You Blind" – 4:35
 "Halfway to Heaven" – 5:05

 UK CD single
 "If You Asked Me To" – 3:55
 "Where Does My Heart Beat Now" – 4:33
 "Love You Blind" – 4:35

 US 7-inch and CD single
 "If You Asked Me To" – 3:55
 "Where Does My Heart Beat Now" – 4:33

Charts

Weekly charts

Year-end charts

All-time charts

Release history

See also 
Billboard Year-End Hot 100 singles of 1992
List of Billboard Hot 100 top-ten singles in 1992
List of Hot Adult Contemporary number ones of 1992
List of number-one singles of 1992 (Canada)

References

External links 

1989 singles
1989 songs
1992 singles
1980s ballads
Celine Dion songs
Licence to Kill
MCA Records singles
Columbia Records singles
Epic Records singles
Patti LaBelle songs
Pop ballads
RPM Top Singles number-one singles
Songs from James Bond films
Songs written by Diane Warren